Mayyazhippuzhayude Theerangalil is a Malayalam language novel by M. Mukundan. The novel vividly describes the political and social background of Mahé (Mayyazhi), the former French colony, in the past, in a mystical way. The novel was translated into Tamil, English and French, All the versions winning accolades.

Historic background
The novel is based upon the lives of a few families of Mahé enclave.  The new generation in Mahé wanted to merge the French enclave with India.  The older people were loyal to the French rulers and believed in a romantic charm of the colonial rule.  Two persons called Kanaran and Dasan take leadership of the fight against the French.  The novel includes finer details about the romance of French rule in Mahé. The streets of Mahé with French names revoke an old charm.  There is a christian church and many Hindu temples mentioned in the story.  The story describes the first revolution when the activists removed the national flag from one of the government offices.  This revolution was certainly a failure as the French navy came and the activists fled across the Mahé Bridge.  The second and final revolution was however successful and the French rulers escaped by ship.

Plot summary
The protagonist in the novel is a young man called Dasan who was born in French Mahé and educated in Pondicherry. Even though he was offered a job in the French administration and assistance for higher education in Paris, he instead joins the freedom movement led by Gandhian Kanaran, and is attracted by communist ideology. A girl called Chandrika falls in love with him, but he is not able to promise her a married life because of his commitment to the revolution. A French court sentences Dasan to 12 years of imprisonment, but Dasan escapes captivity by walking across to the Indian Union. Very soon he comes back to Mahé leading a group of volunteers and frees Mahé from foreign rule. The French national flag is removed and the Indian national flag is hoisted on government buildings. Despite being a local hero Achu, he struggles for his livelihood as he refuses to accept regular employment and join the mainstream lifestyle. His girlfriend is forced by her parents to marry another man, so she commits suicide. Dasan also follows her way to reach the abode of the soul on the Velliyamkallu island on the Mahé coast.

Characters
 Dasan, the protagonist
 Chandrika, Dasan's girlfriend
 Kunjananthan, Teacher of Dasan, revolutionary
 Kanaretttan, freedom fighter
 Mooppan, French administrator (Big Sayiv)
 Unni Nair, French loyalist and bar owner
Damu Writer , Dasan's father
 Pappan, revolutionary
 Kunhichirutha, courtesan
 Karunan, French officer
 Kurumbi Amma, grandmother of Dasan and French loyalist.
 Leslie, French magistrate
 Achu, the village appy

 Chekku Mooppar, mayor
 David, French officer
 Kowsu, Dasan's mother
 Kunjakkan, the lamp-lighter
 Kunjanan, French loyalist
 Bharathan, Chandrika's Father
 Leela, Chandrika's Mother
 Ghirija, dasan's sister
Achu , husband of Ghirija, A local hero

French named streets of Mahé
 Rue de la Prison
 Rue du Gouvernement
 Rue de l'église (Church Road)
 Rue de la Residence

Translations
 Tamil: 1998. Mayyazhi Karaiyoram. Trans. Rudra Thulasidhas (A) Ilambharathi.  National Book Trust.
 English: 1999. On the Banks of the Mayyazhi. Trans. Gita Krishnankutty. Chennai: Manas.
 French: 2002. Sur les rives du fleuve Mahé. Trans. Sophie Bastide-Foltz. Actes Sud.Win

In popular culture
 The characters of Mukundan in the novel are depicted in the form of a stone mural on Mahé Walk in Mahé. The Velliyankallu island described in the novel is also seen from the walkway.
 A short film in Malayalam language called BONJOUR MAYYAZHI tells the story of the characters of the novel Mayyazhippuzhayude Theerangalil coming back and questioning the novelist.

References

1974 novels
Malayalam novels
Novels by M. Mukundan
Novels set in Kerala
Mahe district
DC Books books
1974 Indian novels